The thirteenth series of Geordie Shore, a British television programme based in Newcastle upon Tyne was confirmed on 23 May 2015 when it was confirmed that MTV had renewed the series for a further three series taking it up to the thirteenth series, and began on 25 October 2016. The series was filmed in June and July 2016 and concluded on 20 December 2016. This was the first series not to include Charlotte Crosby since she made her exit during the previous series. It also features the return of former cast members Sophie Kasaei and Kyle Christie who previously made a brief return during the Big Birthday Battle anniversary series, and is the last to feature Chantelle Connelly after it was revealed she quit the show mid-series. This series was filmed in various party resort towns in island destinations, including Ayia Napa, Corfu, Kavos, Ibiza and Magaluf. It was also later announced that this would be Holly Hagan's last series after she quit in the series finale, along with Kyle Christie.

Cast
 Aaron Chalmers
 Chantelle Connelly
 Chloe Ferry
 Gaz Beadle
 Holly Hagan
 Kyle Christie
 Marnie Simpson
 Marty McKenna
 Nathan Henry
 Scott Timlin
Sophie Kasaei

Duration of cast 

 = Cast member is featured in this episode.
 = Cast member voluntarily leaves the house.
 = Cast member returns to the house.
 = Cast member leaves the series.
 = Cast member returns to the series.
 = Cast member does not feature in this episode.
 = Cast member is not officially a cast member in this episode.

Episodes

Ratings

References

2016 British television seasons
Series 13